New Ipswich Mountain is a summit within the Wapack Range of mountains in south-central New Hampshire, United States. It lies within the town of New Ipswich and is traversed by the  Wapack Trail. Barrett Mountain is located directly to the north along the Wapack ridgeline; Stony Top, a subordinate peak of Pratt Mountain, lies to the south. The summit of the mountain is mostly wooded, but a number of rocky ledges below the summit offer views of the surrounding countryside.

The east side of the mountain drains into the Souhegan River watershed, to the Merrimack River thence the Atlantic Ocean; the west side drains into the Millers River watershed, to the Connecticut River, thence into Long Island Sound.

References

 Southern New Hampshire Trail Guide (1999). Boston: The Appalachian Mountain Club.
 Flanders, John (1991) Wapack Trail Guide. West Peterborough, New Hampshire: Friends of the Wapack.

External links
 "Friends of the Wapack".

Mountains of Hillsborough County, New Hampshire
Mountains of New Hampshire